Zaruiyeh-ye Olya (also Romanized as Zārū'īyeh-ye 'Olyā; also known as Zārū'īyeh-ye Bālā) is a village in Jowzam Rural District, Dehaj District, Shahr-e Babak County, Kerman Province, Iran. At the 2006 census, its population was 39, in 11 families.

References 

Populated places in Shahr-e Babak County